Daniel Oreskes is an American actor known for his roles in Law & Order, and Law & Order: Organized Crime. Oreskes has also appeared in numerous Broadway productions and narrates audiobooks.

Oreskes graduated from the University of Pennsylvania and the London Academy of Music and Dramatic Art. He is the brother of academic Naomi Oreskes and former journalist Michael Oreskes.

Filmography

Film

Television

Video games

References

External links
 

Living people
Male actors from New York (state)
University of Pennsylvania alumni
Alumni of the London Academy of Music and Dramatic Art
Year of birth missing (living people)
Place of birth missing (living people)